Cañí is a Spanish adjective, which refers to the Romani people. La España cañí is a set phrase that refers to folkloric Spain and is sometimes used derogatorily, although not referring specifically to Romani people but to Spanish popular culture at large.

Cañí is the origin of the song name España cañí, meaning Gypsy Spain, a Spanish pasodoble often played at bullfights, and also known as the Spanish Gypsy Dance.

References

Antiziganism in Spain
Ethnic and religious slurs
Romani in Spain
Spanish words and phrases